Granger High School is a public high school located in West Valley City, Utah, United States.

The school enrollment for the 2019–20 school year was 3,155 with 123 teachers, for a teacher to student ratio of 25.64. 

The mascot is the Granger Lancer. The school was designed with a King Arthur theme, hence the cafeteria is known as Stonehenge, and the school's colors are the same as King Arthur's (crimson red, Columbia blue, and silver gray).

Granger High belongs to the Granite School District.  It opened in 1958.

As of the 2020-2021 school year, Granger's students are 60.5% Hispanic, 20.9% White, 11.7% Asian/Pacific Islander, 2.0% Native American and 4.2% African-American.

Granger High School offers many competitive and non-competitive athletic, academic, and extra-curricular options.  Students can choose from Accolade (Creative Writing), AVID, band, baseball, basketball, choir, cross country, cheerleading, Dance Company, DECA, Debate, FBLA, FCCLA, football, French Club, Glee, GTV, golf, Japanese Club, Key Club, Lancer Action Team, Latin Club, Latinos in Action, Madrigals, Math Club, MESA, NHS, Orchestra,  SkillsUSA, soccer, softball, Spanish Club, Stage Crew, Sterling Scholars, Student Government, swimming, tennis, theatre, track and field, Tri-Color Times (student newspaper), volleyball, wrestling, Yearbook, and the Excaliburs drill team.

The current principal of Granger High School is Dr. Tyler Howe, previously the principal of West Lake STEM, one of the junior high schools located in the Granger network. The current assistant principals are Dottie Alo, Ben Anderson, David Beck, Shawn Neilson, and Jeff Jackson. As of the 2013–14 school year, students of Granger are attending school in a brand new building. The new high school is the biggest in the state of Utah.

See also
 List of high schools in Utah

References

External links
Official Granger High website
Other information on Granger High School

Public high schools in Utah
Educational institutions established in 1958
Schools in Salt Lake County, Utah
Buildings and structures in West Valley City, Utah
1958 establishments in Utah